"Click Click Boom" is a song by the American rock band Saliva. It was released in 2001 on their second album Every Six Seconds as the lead single. The song was put on the 2001 Clear Channel memorandum. However, no actual lyrical changes were made. The song reappeared on the band's next studio effort (Back into Your System) as a special edition bonus track.

The song peaked at number 25 on Alternative Airplay and number 15 on Mainstream Rock.

Music video 
A music video was released for the song. The video revolves around a boy who unwittingly finds himself in a moshpit in which the band performs. Near the end of the video, after being enticed by a girl straight out from the crowd, the boy joins the moshpit. After the end of the song, the boy is shown moshing alone in the empty space where the band performed.

In popular culture 
 The song is featured in the films The Fast and the Furious, The New Guy, How High, Cradle 2 the Grave and Talladega Nights.
 The song is featured in the soundtrack for the video games UFC 2009 Undisputed, BMX XXX, TD Overdrive, MX 2002, Project Gotham Racing, and Operation Flashpoint: Red River.
 It was also the theme of WWF's 2001 edition of No Mercy.
 The song is used daily as bumper music on Craig Carton and Evan Roberts's WFAN program coming back from the break closest to 5 PM.

References

External links 

2001 singles
2001 songs
Saliva (band) songs
Island Records singles
Song recordings produced by Bob Marlette
Songs written by Bob Marlette
Songs written by Josey Scott